The women's lead competition in sport climbing at the 2013 World Games took place on 4 August 2013 at the Velodrome Exterior in Cali, Colombia.

Competition format
A total of 18 athletes entered the competition. Top 8 climbers from semifinal qualifies to the final.

Results

Semifinal

Final

References 

 
2013 World Games